The Jeune Garde is a French anti-fascist organisation.

History 
The Jeune Garde was founded in January 2018 in Lyon. In 2019, a Strasbourg section was founded and in 2020, a section in Paris was founded. In 2021, local sections in Lille and Montpellier were founded. The group uses the Three Arrows as its logo, basing itself off the logo of the French Section of the Workers' International of the first half of the 20th century.

In September 2021, members of the far-right Zouaves Paris group assaulted Raphaël Arnault, the Jeune Garde's Lyon spokesperson, as he disembarked from a train arriving in Paris. In late-November 2021, Jeune Garde demonstrators clashed with members of the Collectif Némésis, an Identitarian advocacy group that self-describes as feminist, after members of Némésis attempted to join a protest march against sexual violence in Paris organised by the Collectif NousToutes. In December 2021, National Assembly deputy Alexis Corbière and regional councillor Raquel Garrido filed a case with the police against two supporters of far-right politician Éric Zemmour after the Jeune Garde published a video online of the two Zemmour supporters at a firing range doing target practice while talking about several politicians that they would hunt, including Cobière and Garrido.

In February 2022, an anti-fascist conference in Strasbourg that the group attended was attacked by members of the neo-Nazi Strasbourg Offender hooligan group. In May 2022, Arnault resigned as spokesperson for the Lyon section to run in the 2022 French legislative election as a candidate with the New Ecological and Social People's Union.

Goals 
In March 2018, the group published a statement describing their aims as re-invigorating the anti-fascist movement in the city, saying that pre-existing movements were too isolated from society and treated fascist groups as if they existed in a vacuum, neglecting the necessity of struggles against capitalism and racism and other forms of oppression. Arnault has stated that increasing collaboration between different left-wing movements is a key objective for the group.

Maya Valka, spokesperson for the Paris section, has stated that the group aims to develop a more day-to-day struggle against fascism, and not just an anti-fascism that responds to emergency situations. Valka has also stated that group aims to develop and international and class-focused feminism, saying that feminism and anti-fascism go hand-in-hand.

Criticism 
The Jeune Garde has been criticised by some anti-fascists for not doing enough to centre anti-racism in its movement.

References

External links 

Anti-fascism in France
2018 establishments in France
Political organizations based in France